This is a list of villages in Telemark, a county of Norway. Villages which are the administrative centers of their municipality are highlighted in blue and marked with this symbol (†) on this list. The term "villages" refers includes settlements, hamlets, and farm areas in Telemark county. The list excludes cities/towns located in Telemark. For other counties see the lists of villages in Norway.

References

External links

Telemark